Southern Italian koiné was a koiné language that had evolved due to contact between Naples, Amalfi, Salerno and other ports. It was spread by the Normans as a result of policies that favoured the Latin-rite Catholicism of the Holy See over the local Greek Rites, and Languages. Its spread may have contributed substantially to the then developing Sicilian language.

References

Languages of Sicily
Medieval Greek
Languages of Campania
Languages of Calabria